Thomas Bryant (May 21, 1930 – January 3, 1982) was an American jazz double-bassist.

Bryant grew up in a musical family in Philadelphia; his mother was a choir director, his brother Ray Bryant was a pianist, and another brother, Len Bryant, is a vocalist and drummer. Tommy Bryant began playing bass at the age of 12 and played in many local outfits, including Billy Krechmer's. In the late 1940s Bryant joined Elmer Snowden's band, staying there until 1952, when he took a tour of duty during the Korean War. In 1956 he returned and formed his own trio, though he is better known for his work with musicians such as Jo Jones (1958), Charlie Shavers (1959), Roy Eldridge, Dizzy Gillespie, Barney Wilen, Benny Golson, Big Joe Turner and Coleman Hawkins. In the last ten years of his life he played in the follow-up band to The Ink Spots.

Bryant also recorded with Mahalia Jackson under the name Tom Bryant.

Discography 
With Ray Bryant
Ray Bryant Plays (Signature, 1959)
Little Susie (Columbia, 1960)
Groove House (Sue, 1963)
Soul (Sue, 1965)
With Dizzy Gillespie
Duets (Verve Records, 1957)
The Greatest Trumpet of Them All (Verve, 1957)
Sonny Side Up (Verve, 1957) - with Sonny Rollins and Sonny Stitt
With Benny Golson
Gone with Golson (New Jazz Records, 1959)
With Jo Jones
One Key Up (Vanguard, 1955)
Jo Jones Plus Two (Vanguard, 1959)
Jo Jones Trio (Everest, 1959)
With Hank Mobley, Curtis Fuller, Lee Morgan and Billy Root
Monday Night at Birdland (Roulette, 1958)
Another Monday Night at Birdland (Roulette, 1959)
With Elmer Snowden
"Harlem Banjo" (Riverside Records, 1960)
"Saturday Night Fish Fry" (Fontana Records, 1962)
With Roy Eldridge
The Nifty Cat (New World Records, 1970) 
With Barney Wilen
Newport `59  (Fresh Sound Records, 1959)

References

1930 births
1982 deaths
American jazz double-bassists
Male double-bassists
Musicians from Philadelphia
20th-century American musicians
Jazz musicians from Pennsylvania
20th-century double-bassists
20th-century American male musicians
American male jazz musicians